Not Too Young may refer to:

Music
"Not Too Young", song by Clique Girlz and the original title of their album Incredible
"Not Too Young", song by Mandy Moore from So Real
"Not Too Young", song by Sabina Ddumba
"Not Too Young", song by Jekalyn Carr
"Not Too Young to Get Married", song by Bob B. Soxx & the Blue Jeans
"Not Too Young", song by Icona Pop